330 West 42nd Street, also the McGraw-Hill Building and formerly the GHI Building, is a skyscraper in the Hell's Kitchen neighborhood of Manhattan in New York City. Designed by Raymond Hood and J. André Fouilhoux in a mixture of the International Style, Art Deco, and Art Moderne styles, the building was constructed from 1930 to 1931 and originally served as the headquarters of McGraw-Hill Companies. The  building contains 33 stories. 

The building's massing, or shape, consists of numerous setbacks on the 41st and 42nd Street sides, which were included to comply with the 1916 Zoning Resolution. The facade is made of blue-green terracotta ceramic tile panels, alternating with green-metal-framed windows, with a strongly horizontal orientation. The facade was intended to blend in with the sky regardless of the atmospheric condition. The entrance and original lobby were decorated with light blue and dark green panels. Most of the upper stories were similar in floor plan, except for their widths, which varied due to the setbacks on the facade. At the time of its completion, 330 West 42nd Street was controversial for the use of horizontal emphasis on its facade, which its contemporaries lacked. In subsequent decades, architectural critics recognized the building as an early example of the International Style.

McGraw-Hill Companies bought the land in early 1930 to replace a smaller headquarters; the company originally took three-quarters of the space, renting out the other stories. As 42nd Street declined, the building was more of a liability. McGraw-Hill moved in 1972 to 1221 Avenue of the Americas. The building subsequently served as the headquarters of Group Health Insurance (GHI). Since then, ownership of 330 West 42nd Street has changed several times. In 2021, the building's owner Resolution Real Estate completely renovated the building, including the lobby, to designs by Moed de Armas and Shannon. 330 West 42nd Street was designated a city landmark by the New York City Landmarks Preservation Commission (LPC) and is listed on the National Register of Historic Places (NRHP) as a National Historic Landmark.

Site
330 West 42nd Street is on the south side of 42nd Street, between Eighth and Ninth Avenues, in the Hell's Kitchen neighborhood of Manhattan in New York City. It is on the same city block as The Orion to the west and part of the Port Authority Bus Terminal to the east; the building is also across from Holy Cross Church in the north and the remainder of the bus terminal to the south. The New York City Subway's 42nd Street/Port Authority Bus Terminal station and Eleven Times Square are on Eighth Avenue, less than one block east.

In the late 1920s, the surrounding area had low-rise residences. The building's site was occupied by five tenements of four to five stories on 42nd Street and six tenements of four stories on 41st Street. On the same city block, John A. Larkin acquired several lots totaling  in 1926. On the site, Larkin proposed the Larkin Tower or (Larkin Building), a 110-story,  office skyscraper clad mainly in stone and steel, which would have been the world's tallest building. The floor area of the Larkin Tower's upper stories would have been so small as to be economically infeasible, and critics also disapproved of what was then an extreme height, leading to its cancellation in 1930. Part of the site then became the present 330 West 42nd Street. Many of the surrounding tenements had been converted to office buildings by the 1930s.

Architecture
330 West 42nd Street was designed by Raymond Hood and J. André Fouilhoux, of the firm Hood, Godley, and Fouilhoux, in a mixture of the International Style, Art Deco, and Art Moderne styles. It was completed in 1931 as the headquarters of publisher McGraw-Hill Companies. The design of 330 West 42nd Street was evocative of those of New York City's earlier factory buildings. As Architectural Forum magazine said, "The requirements peculiar to a publishing business have formed the basis for the entire structure—in plan, section and elevation." In an issue of the McGraw-Hill News in 1931, Hood had written, "Economy and good working conditions were the three factors uppermost in mind" during the building's planning.

Form 

330 West 42nd Street is designed as a 35-story building with setbacks to comply with the 1916 Zoning Resolution. The massing of the building contains setbacks at the 11th and 16th floors on both 41st and 42nd Streets, as well as at the 7th floor on 41st Street. Each of these setbacks is only one bay deep. At the 32nd and 34th floors, the building contains additional setbacks.

Because the setbacks are only placed on the northern and southern elevations of the facade, the setbacks are only visible from the west and east. The northern and southern elevations appear to be a slab when viewed head-on. Both elevations are seven bays wide on all stories. Under the 1916 zoning code, setbacks were not required on the facades that abutted other land lots. The lack of setbacks on the western and eastern elevations made the building stand out as an industrial structure, even in the low-rise Hell's Kitchen neighborhood. Architectural writer Eric P. Nash likened the massing to that of an ocean liner.

Facade 
The building was largely designed with a plain facade, except for the original ground level and the upper stories. Unlike in Art Deco structures of the past, 330 West 42nd Street relied on color as a primary means of ornament. At the time of the building's construction, Hood had predicted that the future skyline of New York City would "consist of gaily colored buildings", though this did not come true until postmodern architecture became popular later in the 20th century.

Base 
At ground level on 42nd Street, the building contains what were originally a pair of three-bay-wide glass storefronts, which were initially used as McGraw-Hill's bookstore and a bank. These curve inward to become the walls of the central entrance doorway with five doors, recessed within the facade. The curved walls between the storefront and the recessed entrance contain gold- and silver-colored metal bands, alternating with dark-green and light-blue panels. The company newspaper McGraw-Hill News characterized the bands as "lacquered like the body of a motor car". Above the ground level is a set of light-blue panels with silver-colored metal bands. This entrance originally had Art Deco-style letters with the words . Within the doorway were steel doors topped by a glass transom.

The ground level on 41st Street originally had garage doors. In 2021, some of these garage doors were proposed for replacement with glass walls.

Shaft 
The exterior walls of the building are blue-green terracotta ceramic panels alternating with sash windows. Hood chose to use steel and terracotta rather than stone because, in his view, stone and brick tended to darken relatively quickly after a structure's completion. The terracotta was manufactured by Federal Seaboard Terra Cotta Corporation. The terracotta panels between each story are laid in six glazed courses or layers, which gradually become lighter on higher stories. These panels were designed to give the appearance they were shimmering, giving the facade a slightly different tint during different times of day. The terracotta panels were built to the minimum thickness required by city building codes. At the time of 330 West 42nd Street's construction, terracotta was not commonly used in International Style structures, which frequently contained glass, steel, and concrete instead.

In designing the building, Hood had considered several different colors for the terracotta panels, including "Chinese red", orange, yellow, and gray. Ultimately, blue-green was selected for its "atmospheric quality", which was suitable regardless of the color of the sky on any given day. Hood referred to the color as blue, while McGraw-Hill referred to the color as green. McGraw-Hill executive James H. McGraw Jr., who had selected the color himself, was elsewhere for much of the building's construction in 1931, but was supposedly "appalled" at the color of the building when he returned. The building was nicknamed the "Green Building", the "Green Kremlin", the "green giant", and the "green monster" due to its color. Eric Nash likened the color to the Ishtar Gate of Babylon. The blue-green color contrasted with the red and white of the Daily News Building and the black and gold of the American Radiator Building, both of which Hood had also designed. 

There are more than four thousand windows, each of which contains a frame painted apple green. The windows are grouped into sets of three or four, separated horizontally by dark metal spandrel panels, and were built to the maximum height allowed under city construction codes of the time. Due to restrictions on the amount of glass a facade was allowed to have, the windows were divided horizontally by metal bars. The vertical mullions between windows, as well as the tops of each window sash, were painted in vermillion. These painted bands were intended to give the impression that each group of windows was a single window opening.

The windows and terracotta panels were juxtaposed to emphasize the horizontal dimensions, a characteristic of the International Style. This was a great contrast to Art Deco facades, which were more vertically oriented. The only deviation from the facade's horizontal emphasis is on the eastern facade, which contains a pair of blue-green vertical strips at its center. After the structure's completion in 1931, Hood and McGraw-Hill had compared the facade to an automobile, a common Art Deco symbol. In particular, Hood thought the facade had a "shimmery, satin finish" similar to that of an automobile.

Top stories 

The 32nd and 33rd floors consist of projecting sets of piers, between which are pairs of windows. These two stories originally contained the McGraw-Hill executive offices and were designed to emphasize the importance of McGraw-Hill's corporate leadership. A vermillion strip ran underneath the projecting course that surrounded the penthouse. The western and eastern facades are clad with horizontal "ribs" at the 34th and 35th stories. Architectural historian Anthony W. Robins likened the ribbed crown to the "German Expressionism of Erich Mendelsohn". 

A set of  Art Deco-style letters with the words  is mounted in front of the 34th story windows. These letters, custom made of terracotta blocks, stood against the blue and green terracotta panels of the facade, concealing the mechanical equipment atop 330 West 42nd Street. They were painted white with orange stripes, but that color was removed when McGraw-Hill sold the building. At some point in the late 20th century, the New York City Landmarks Preservation Commission (LPC) approved a motion to change the letters to "GHI", representing former owner Group Health Insurance, although it was changed back by the 1990s.

Features 
The McGraw-Hill Building contains  of interior space. As designed, McGraw-Hill used about three-quarters of the total internal space.

Lobby
The lobby's design was a continuation of the exterior, a common trend for Art Deco designs. It originally consisted of a passageway from the 42nd Street entrance, whose walls were decorated with similar dark-green and light-blue bands as the entrance way. There were doorways that led to the bookstore on the left (east) wall and to the bank on the right (west) wall. The elevator lobby contained solid green enamel walls. The elevator doors were made of metal and decorated with bronze stripes, while floor-indicator markers hung above the doorways. Elevator staff wore green uniforms to correspond with the green baked-enamel interiors of each elevator cab.

The original lobby was demolished in 2021. There was a reception area to the left and a large seating area to the right. Gerard Nocera, a managing partner for the asset manager that controlled the building, said at the time: "It's going to be a lobby tenants will gravitate toward and will want to hang out in."

Upper floors
Industrial uses were placed on the second through tenth floors, which were larger and relatively poorly lit, while offices were placed on the smaller, better-lit upper floors. The industrial stories were largely designed for functional purposes, with elevator banks at the center of each floor. The printing plant was placed below the sixth-floor setback while the book production was housed in the loft space above the setback. The bindery was on the fifth floor, the press room on the sixth floor, and the composing room on the seventh floor. These stories were converted to standard office space by 1933.

The upper stories were designed in a relatively simple style characterized as "Raymond Hood Colonial". The ninth through 15th floors had been exclusively intended for rental use, while McGraw-Hill generally occupied the 16th to 33rd floors. Few partitions were erected on these stories, creating an open plan with various open spaces for McGraw-Hill's subsidiaries. Except for the 32nd and 33rd stories, there were generally no private offices, as an employee who desired such privacy could work from home instead. The penthouse at the 32nd and 33rd stories originally contained the corporate suites of McGraw-Hill Publishers. The McGraw-Hill corporate offices were relatively conservative in design, being designed in the Georgian and Colonial Revival styles. These stories also contained a cafeteria for McGraw-Hill executives and a 250-seat auditorium.

Following a 2021 renovation, the upper floors are still arranged in an open plan. The ceilings had been modified so the structural-steel beams were exposed. In addition, the windows were replaced with units that could open and close, and some of the suites have terraces. Furthermore, there are several tenant lounges, conference areas, event spaces, and fitness center. The setbacks have nine landscaped terraces that collectively cover . As a result of the COVID-19 pandemic, the heating, ventilation, and air conditioning system was also completely replaced and air filters were installed.

History

Development 

The McGraw-Hill Publishing Company was formed in 1917 when James H. McGraw and John A. Hill merged their respective companies. It was then headquartered at the Hill Publishing Building at 475 Tenth Avenue, at the corner with 36th Street. With numerous acquisitions of other companies over the following decades, the McGraw-Hill Publishing Company found its existing space insufficient by the late 1920s. The twelve-story building at Tenth Avenue was expanded by an additional story and some freight elevators in that building were converted to passenger use. Even so, by 1929, employees of that building were being asked to walk up or down some flights rather than take the elevators. The same year, a committee was appointed to oversee the development of a new building.

The new-building committee considered numerous sites on the area bounded clockwise from north by 47th Street, Second Avenue, 34th Street, and Ninth Avenue. The group identified Larkin's 42nd Street lot, as well as another lot at Eighth Avenue and 41st Street half a block east, as feasible sites. In May 1930, McGraw-Hill Companies bought the 47,500-square-foot Larkin site at 326–346 West 42nd Street and 327–345 West 41st Street. The Larkin site had been selected specifically for its convenience and relatively low price. McGraw-Hill intended for its skyscraper to accommodate both commercial and industrial uses, and much of Midtown Manhattan was not zoned for such a purpose. Furthermore, the site was near the major rail hubs at Grand Central Terminal and Pennsylvania Station; post offices; and the Engineering Societies' Building and Engineers' Club.

Construction began on December 29, 1930, when the first rivet was driven by the publishing company's vice president James H. McGraw Jr. Starrett Brothers, the main contractor, hired about 800 construction workers for the project. Steelwork started immediately afterward. The company secured a $3.8 million loan to finance the building's construction a week after work started. Work progressed quickly and was nearly completed by June 1931; that month, twenty workers received awards for "superior craftsmanship".

McGraw-Hill use 
McGraw-Hill's publishing division moved into the building by October 25, 1931. Six weeks later, the McGraw-Hill Book Company relocated from its longtime headquarters at 370 Seventh Avenue to the new building at 330 West 42nd Street. Construction had taken fourteen months from planning to completion. The building had initially been expected to cost $2.7 million but ran $642,000 over budget. As one of the tallest buildings in Hell's Kitchen at the time, the McGraw-Hill Building stood out from the rest of the neighborhood. The company had hoped that the building would be one of several on 42nd Street after a planned rezoning of the street that never happened. 

Frank Gale of McGraw-Hill wrote in January 1932, three months after the building's completion, that only six of the 33 usable office stories had not been occupied by then. With the onset of the Great Depression, the industrial equipment on the lower floors became obsolete and was sold in January 1931. In addition to McGraw-Hill's headquarters, space was rented to tenants such as the J. C. Valentine Company; the Topics Publishing Company; Charles Eneu Johnson, a printer-ink supplier; Media Records, an advertising-statistics company; the International Development Corporation; the Edge Moor Iron Company; United Cigar Stores; the Home Owners' Loan Corporation; and the Adolphe Hurst Company, an importing concern.  By 1935, the building was almost fully occupied. Subsequent tenants included pulp publisher Martin Goodman, who founded Timely Comics (Marvel Comics’ common name during the Golden Age) at the building during 1939, as well as soap firm Givaudan. McGraw-Hill suffered from financial issues of its own, occupying only 34 percent of the floor area by 1939. 

During World War II, the McGraw-Hill Building's owners devised emergency blackout procedures in case of an air raid warning, because of the building's large number of windows relative to other structures in the area. The western part of McGraw-Hill's lot, which had not been developed for the McGraw-Hill Building, was proposed as the site of an interstate bus terminal in 1940, due to the building's proximity to the Lincoln Tunnel entrance to New Jersey. The terminal was approved in early 1941, but plans for the terminal were delayed by the war, and the terminal ultimately was instead built one block south in 1950. The adjacent lot ultimately was developed as a post office. In the mid-1950s, the Port Authority of New York and New Jersey started training "spotters" to look at traffic on the Lincoln Tunnel approaches from the 35th floor of the McGraw-Hill Building. The spotters used two-way radios to direct traffic, as well as a CCTV camera mounted on the top of the building. 

The McGraw-Hill Companies moved some of its publications to 1301 Avenue of the Americas in 1964 due to a lack of space at 330 West 42nd Street. At that time, the company occupied 94 percent of the space at 330 West 42nd Street and was planning to expand the structure. The company also took space at 620 Eighth Avenue. McGraw-Hill then announced its intention to develop additional stories atop the Port Authority Bus Terminal annex, being built immediately to the east, but the plan did not come to fruition. The company was unable to expand to the west because the post office was there. Ultimately, McGraw-Hill announced in 1967 that it would construct a new headquarters at 1221 Avenue of the Americas, one of the "XYZ Buildings" at Rockefeller Center. McGraw-Hill sold 330 West 42nd Street to C. Russell Feldmann in 1970. The sale price was subsequently reported at $15 million. Although Feldmann wanted to convert the building into office space, his financial troubles led McGraw-Hill to retake the property in February 1973 to satisfy an unpaid mortgage of $11.1 million, netting McGraw-Hill a profit of $4 million.

Late 20th century

McGraw-Hill moved to 1221 Avenue of the Americas in 1972. Its old headquarters at 330 West 42nd Street was placed for sale at under $15 million, less than ten percent of the $175 million construction price of its new building. Despite the relatively low price, 330 West 42nd Street stood vacant for three years, during which only a maintenance crew of ten workers was staffed in the building. The vacancy was attributed to developers' reluctance to take space on West 42nd Street, which was considered "tawdry", and the decline in the general neighborhood. During this time, McGraw-Hill lost $650,000 per year on maintenance and taxes for the vacant building. 

The building was purchased in late 1974 by medical insurance company Group Health Inc. (GHI) for $5.5 million, becoming the GHI Building. At the time, GHI was headquartered at 230 West 41st Street, one block west, but urgently needed another . Through the end of the 1970s, the building was only one-third occupied, with most of that space being taken by GHI. The rundown character of the Hell's Kitchen neighborhood meant that rent at 330 West 42nd Street was relatively cheap and, thus, the office space was taken by organizations like the 42nd Street Development Corporation. Following lobbying from that organization, the LPC designated 330 West 42nd Street as a city landmark on September 11, 1979, and the building was listed on the National Register of Historic Places on March 28, 1980.

330 West 42nd Street was taken over by Newmark & Company in February 1980, although GHI remained in the building. The new owners commenced a $2 million rehabilitation of the building; to reduce vacancies, Newmark president Jeffrey Gural rented space to any tenants who could reliably pay. The lobby was renovated by architects Warner Burns Toan & Lunde and interior designers Valerian Rybar and Jean-Francois Daigre. Mechanical systems were also updated throughout the building. A site-specific artwork, an angular metal sculpture by Owen Morrel entitled Boomerang, was mounted  up the southeast corner in 1981. By the end of that year, 330 West 42nd Street was fully rented again, due in part to the redevelopment of the surrounding stretch of 42nd Street. Gural had become more selective with tenants, only accepting large leases and telling The New York Times in 1981 that he could bring the building to full occupancy "three times over in ten minutes". These tenants included a trading floor of Paine Webber, as well as the New York City Department of Cultural Affairs. The base of the building became a popular performance venue for bands.

330 West 42nd Street was declared a National Historic Landmark in 1989. GHI moved out of 330 West 42nd Street in 1994, taking space at its own building at 441 Ninth Avenue. The same year Deco Towers Associates, a foreign investment group, acquired 330 West 42nd Street as its sole property. The sale had become complicated by the fact that the Federal Deposit Insurance Corporation had taken over the building's mortgage holder, the American Savings Bank, which had gone bankrupt. A long-term restoration of the building began in 1998 and continued over the next two decades. Shortly after the project began. Deco Towers dismantled Boomerang, having found severe deterioration in that sculpture during inspections over the previous five years. The company had offered to give the work to Morrel or restore it if funding was provided. The New York City Department of Cultural Affairs (DCLA) moved to a  space at 330 West 42nd Street in 1998, having been forced to relocate from 2 Columbus Circle. The DCLA relocated to the city-owned Surrogate's Courthouse in 2006.

21st century 
330 West 42nd Street received some facade renovations during the mid-2010s. The restoration of the facade won an award in 2019 from the New York Landmarks Conservancy. At the time, the Service Employees International Union (SEIU) was a major tenant, although its lease was scheduled to expire in October 2020. Deco Towers announced in 2018 that it planned to convert the 16th through 34th floors into residential condominiums, following the expiry of SEIU's lease. The plan to convert the upper stories to apartments was subsequently abandoned. By early 2021, the building had been vacated in preparation for its renovation. That February, the LPC approved a plan by Moed de Armas and Shannon Architects (MdeAS) to renovate part of the building. The plans called for renovating the facade and signs on the ground floor, as well as a new tenant doorway at West 42nd Street. MdeAS also proposed gutting the streamlined lobby as part of a series of changes to reconfigure the lower floors, formerly occupied by SEIU, for office use.

After a tweet of the proposed design of the replacement lobby circulated, numerous preservationists petitioned the LPC to grant landmark status to the lobby's interior. A plan to remove the  sign atop the crown, replacing it with one spelling out the building's address, was rejected by the LPC after opposition from preservationists. The following month, a spokesperson for the building's owner claimed that the lobby had mostly been demolished but that pieces were being stored. According to Gerard Nocera of Resolution Real Estate (the asset manager for Deco Towers), the LPC had rejected three requests to preserve the lobby during the preceding decades. The LPC had declined to preserve the lobby because it had been substantially altered during the 1980s. The $120 million renovation had included adding amenity spaces, refurbishing the office floors into an open plan, reconfiguring the lobby, and installing operable windows and air filters. In addition, Deco Towers replaced "nonhistorical windows", added doors for loading docks and outdoor terraces, and replaced the elevators.

During September 2021, the New York Supreme Court dismissed a lawsuit from preservationists who sought to protect the lobby, and the owners were allowed to dispose of the lobby's decorations. The lawsuit had been rejected in part because the lobby had been substantially modified. At the time, the original lobby decorations had been removed and placed in storage. The same month, the renovation was completed, and the building's owner Resolution Real Estate started leasing office space. By late 2022, Deco Towers was considering converting the 12th to 32nd stories into apartments, and converting the top two floors into residential amenity spaces, because of declining demand for office space during the COVID-19 pandemic. Under this new plan, designed by Gloria Glass of SLCE Architects, the upper floors would largely contain studio apartments and one-bedroom units, as well as several two-bedroom units. This plan also included creating separate entrances on 42nd Street for office and residential tenants.

Reception 

Upon the McGraw Hill Building's completion, much controversy arose over its use of the International Style, which was then relatively new compared to Art Moderne and Art Deco. George Shepard Chappell, writing in The New Yorker under the pseudonym "T-Square", lambasted the McGraw Hill Building's use of horizontal lines, saying: "The fact remains that a tall building, considered as a mass, goes up, not sidewise." Chappell found the building's mass and color to be unappealing, though he did approve of the building's limited use of ornamentation. Alfred T. North commented on the building's controversy, saying, "Lacking all of the earmarks of historical architecture, this building is running the gauntlet of criticism." Ultimately, North was unable to determine the style in which 330 West 42nd Street was designed.

Others spoke more positively of 330 West 42nd Street. Upon Hood's death in 1934, shortly after the building's completion, the New York Daily News called the building "among the finest modern achievements in architecture", along with Hood's American Radiator Building, Daily News Building, and Beaux-Arts Apartments. The building was the only skyscraper in the city displayed in Henry-Russell Hitchcock and Philip Johnson's influential International Style exhibition at the Museum of Modern Art in 1932, and the only other U.S. skyscraper at that exhibition, besides the PSFS Building. Hitchcock and Johnson objected only to the crown, which they described as "an illogical and unhappy break in the general system of regularity". In subsequent years, McGraw-Hill came to characterize 330 West 42nd Street as an "International" style building.

With the greater acceptance of the International Style, the McGraw-Hill Building became known as an early example of that style, although other writers described it as having a blend of Art Deco and Art Moderne elements as well. Lewis Mumford wrote in 1953 that 330 West 42nd Street's horizontal facade emphasis was a "logical end" to the early-20th-century development of the skyscraper, alongside the Daily News Building's vertical emphasis, the Empire State Building's height, and the New York Hospital's "spacious setting". Meanwhile, Vincent Scully called it "proto-jukebox modern". When McGraw-Hill moved to 1221 Avenue of the Americas, Architecture Plus magazine wrote, "How could a corporate client, which commissioned such an outstanding structure in those difficult days of the Great Depression, find itself moving into one that is, in architectural terms, a nonentity?" During the building's 1970s vacancy, Paul Goldberger called the lobby "one of the best rooms of the period in New York". When GHI bought the building, an opinion writer for The New York Times celebrated the fact that the "distinctive green giant" would be preserved, even though it was not yet an official landmark. The architect Rem Koolhaas said of the McGraw-Hill Building, "Once again Hood has combined two incompatibles in a single whole."

See also

 Art Deco architecture of New York City
 List of National Historic Landmarks in New York City
 List of New York City Designated Landmarks in Manhattan from 14th to 59th Streets
 National Register of Historic Places listings in Manhattan from 14th to 59th Streets

References

Notes

Citations

Sources

 
 
 
 
 
 

1931 establishments in New York City
42nd Street (Manhattan)
Art Deco architecture in Manhattan
Art Deco skyscrapers
Art Moderne architecture
Office buildings completed in 1931
Office buildings on the National Register of Historic Places in Manhattan
Hell's Kitchen, Manhattan
International style architecture in New York City
National Historic Landmarks in Manhattan
New York City Designated Landmarks in Manhattan
Skyscraper office buildings in Manhattan